Chameleon is the debut album by Norwegian singer Margaret Berger. It was released by BMG Norway on 4 October 2004, five months after she placed second on Norwegian Idol. The album did not receive an official single release, but the music video for the song "Lifetime Guarantee" was awarded a Spellemannprisen.

Track listing 
 "Chameleon" (Margaret Berger, Chris Sansom, Hans Jørgen Støp) – 4:27
 "Lifetime Guarantee" (Berger, Ofstad, Jonny Sjo, Støp) – 3:15
 "Mind Game" (Espen Berg, Berger, Simen M. Eriksrud, Støp) – 4:41
 "Simple Mind" (Berger, Stop) – 3:01
 "Both Sides" (Berger, Stop) – 4:16
 "This is Perfect" (Berger, Stop)
 "Elephant" (Berger, Stop) – 5:40
 "Pleasure" (Ell, Hedstrom) – 3:36
 "Main Offender" (Stop) – 3:52
 "Still" (Berg, Berger, Vidar Bergethon Holm, Støp) – 4:37

Personnel 
 Espen Berg – Bass, Guitar, Programming, Producer, Mixing, Recording
 Margaret Berger – Vocals
 Björn Engelmann at Cutting Room Studios – Mastering
 Simen M. Eriksrud – Keyboards, Programming, Mixing
 Mats Hedström – Programming
 Erik Holm – Drum Programming
 Vidar Bergethon Holm – Bass, Guitar
 Olav Torgeir Kopland – Guitar
 Sjur Milieteig – Trumpet
 Chris Sansom – Mixing, Recording
 Jonny Sjo – Bass
 Hans Jørgen Støp – Bass, Guitar, Keyboards, Vocals (background), Producer, Recording
 Espen Strøm – Guitar

Chart performance

References

External links
 Chameleon on Myspace

2004 debut albums
Margaret Berger albums